Barefoot is an unincorporated community located in Nicholas County, Kentucky, United States.

A post office called Barefoot was established in 1881, and remained in operation until it was discontinued in 1936. The origin of the name "Barefoot" is obscure. Barefoot has been noted for its unusual place name.

References

Unincorporated communities in Nicholas County, Kentucky
Unincorporated communities in Kentucky